Robert Randolph was a Priest in the Roman Catholic Church.

Career
Was made vicar of Aylesbury by the then Prebendary of Aylesbury in 1361 on the death of William de Lundeton. He is mentioned in 1401 as vicar of Aylesbury.

References

 

Year of birth unknown
Year of death unknown
14th-century English Roman Catholic priests